Tunnel Reservoir is an artificial lake and recreational area located in the White Mountains  around the town of Greer, Arizona. This reservoir is one of three lakes known as the Greer Lakes. The Greer Lakes include Bunch, Tunnel and River Reservoirs, and are a short distance apart from each other.  The boating facility offers a boat launching area, boat trailer parking, restrooms, and space for recreational vehicles.  The reservoir is stocked with Rainbow and Brown trout species.

References

External links
 Arizona Boating Locations Facilities Map
 Arizona Fishing Locations Map

White Mountains (Arizona)
Reservoirs in Apache County, Arizona
Apache-Sitgreaves National Forests
Reservoirs in Arizona